Marta Canales Pizarro (17 July 1893 – 6 December 1986) was a Chilean violinist, choral conductor and composer. She was born in Santiago and made her debut as a violinist at age eleven playing Mendelssohn's "Concerto". With her brothers, she founded a chamber ensemble that was active from 1916–1920. After her performing career ended, she studied composition with Luigi Stefano Giarda, and then worked as a composer and choral conductor. She died in Santiago, aged 93.

Works 
Selected works include:
"Marta y María", oratorio for soloists, chorus, organ and string orchestra (1929)
"Misa de Eucaristía" for four mixed voices, chorus and string orchestra (1930)
"Misa de Navidad" for mixed chorus of four voices and orchestra (1930)
"Misa en estilo gregoriano" for voice and organ (1933)
"Madrigales Teresianos", collection of twelve chorals, four mixed voices on the poetry of St. Teresa of Jesus (1933)
"Himnos y cantos sacros en estilo gregoriano" for voice and organ (1936–1940)
"Elevación", poem for organ, harp and string orchestra
"Cuatro canciones de cuna" for four voice choirs
"Dos canciones" for four equal voices
"Cantares Chilenos", collection of ten tunes, harmonized choruses equal voices, drawn from folklore (1946)
"Villancicos", collection of fifty traditional Christmas songs from the folklore or tradition of different nations with harmonized choruses for four equal voices (1946)

References 

1893 births
1986 deaths
20th-century classical composers
Classical violinists
Women classical composers
Chilean classical composers
Musicians from Santiago
20th-century classical violinists
Women classical violinists
Chilean violinists
20th-century women composers